The 1973 Men's South American Volleyball Championship, the 10th tournament, took place in 1973 in Bucaramanga.

Final positions

Men's South American Volleyball Championships
Mens South American Volleyball Championship, 1973
1973 in South American sport
International volleyball competitions hosted by Colombia
1973 in Colombian sport